Fiodor Gurei is a Romanian sprint canoer who competed in the early 1980s. He won a bronze medal in the C-2 500 m event at the 1983 ICF Canoe Sprint World Championships in Tampere, Finland.

References

Living people
Romanian male canoeists
Year of birth missing (living people)
ICF Canoe Sprint World Championships medalists in Canadian